Nathaniel Ayodele Oluwademilade Adamolekun (born 28 August 1998) is a professional footballer. Born in the United States, he has represented Jamaica at youth level.

Club career

Youth
Adamolekun started out with his local team Lonestar SC, before moving to play with the Orlando City academy in 2013.

College
In 2016, Adamolekun began playing college soccer at the University of North Carolina at Chapel Hill, before opting to leave to pursue a professional career.

CD Feirense
In 2017, Adamolekun joined Portuguese side Feirense. He spent time with the under-23 side before spending the 2018-19 season on loan with Pedras Rubras.

FC Pinzgau Saalfelden
Adamolekun moved to Austrian Regionalliga West side Pinzgau Saalfelden in July 2019, where he scored 8 goals in 7 appearances for the club's reserve team.

Austin Bold
On 31 July 2019, Adamolekun returned to his hometown in the United States, joining USL Championship side Austin Bold. He made his debut on 19 August 2020, appearing as an 86th-minute substitute during a 2–2 draw with FC Tulsa.

International career
Adamolekun has been capped at the U17  and u20 for Jamaica internationally. His sister Olufolasade Adamolekun played in the 2019 Women's World Cup for Jamaica.

References

External links
 Nathaniel Adamolekun - Men's Soccer UNC at Chapel Hill bio
 Nathaniel Adamolekun Austin Bold FC bio

1998 births
Austin Bold FC players
Living people
American soccer players
Soccer players from Austin, Texas
Jamaican footballers
Jamaican expatriate footballers
Jamaica youth international footballers
Expatriate soccer players in the United States
Association football forwards
North Carolina Tar Heels men's soccer players
C.D. Feirense players
USL Championship players